Orrevatnet is a lake in the municipality of Klepp in Rogaland county, Norway. The  lake is the largest lake in Jæren. The village of Orre lies on this strip of land to the southeast of the lake.

See also
List of lakes in Norway

References

Klepp
Lakes of Rogaland